The Judah Holcomb House is a historic house at 257 North Granby Road in Granby, Connecticut, Built in 1776, it is a well-preserved example of late Georgian architecture, notable for its elaborate entry surround and its wealth of interior woodwork.  It was listed on the National Register of Historic Places in 1988.

Description and history
The Judah Holcomb House stands northwest of the village center of Granby, on the west side of North Granby Road north of Kearns Drive.  It is a -story wood-frame structure, with a gambrel roof, central chimney, and clapboarded exterior.  Its main facade is five bays wide, with a central entrance.  The entrance surround is particularly fine, with fluted pilasters rising to an architrave and dentillated cornice.  Sash windows are surrounded by simple trim, with those on the second floor butting against the plain box cornice.  The interior of the house follows a typical central chimney plan, including a winding staircase in the front vestibule, parlor spaces to either side of the chimney, and the kitchen behind it.  The downstairs rooms are notable for being entire sheathed in vertical board paneling that is unusually wide, typically  in width, a quantity not seen in other period houses in the state.  Other chambers in the house also exhibit some amount of similar wainscoting.

The house was built about 1776 by Judah Holcomb, when the area was still part of Simsbury.  Holcomb's grandfather was an early settler of the area, and he was politically active, serving as a justice of the peace and in the state legislature.  The house remained in the Holcomb family until 1894.  It is notable for its entry surround, which is rare within the state as a vernacular flat-top surround, contrasting with more widely found broken-scroll pediments.

See also
National Register of Historic Places listings in Hartford County, Connecticut

References

Houses on the National Register of Historic Places in Connecticut
National Register of Historic Places in Hartford County, Connecticut
Houses completed in 1776
Houses in Hartford County, Connecticut
Granby, Connecticut